Oliver Wendell Holmes Junior High School (HJHS) has been in the core of Davis, California at 1220 Drexel Drive since fall 1966. In the 2015–2016 school year, it had 731 students, grades 7–9. The mascot of the school is the Patriot. Classes not taught on campus are usually taken at Davis Senior High School. The school is one of the three Junior High Schools in Davis, California, the others being Frances Ellen Watkins Harper Junior High in East/South Davis, and Ralph Waldo Emerson Junior High in West Davis.

Namesake
The school was named after Oliver Wendell Holmes Sr. (1809–1894), a well-known physician, poet and author from Cambridge, Massachusetts. His son, Oliver Wendell Holmes Jr., was a justice of the U.S. Supreme Court. Holmes was also a relative of one of the first American authors, Anne Bradstreet. His most renowned poem is "Old Ironsides". One of his most popular works is The Autocrat of the Breakfast-Table.  He also developed the popular model of the stereoscope.

Courses
There is a variety of courses offered at HJHS varying from ceramics to computer sciences to assorted foreign languages. It also has the basic classes such as Math, English, and Science. The required courses throughout the three years are as shown below:

General elective courses include Spanish, French, art, ceramics, yearbook, jazz band, choir, concert band, orchestra, industrial technology, leadership, computer science, robotics, multimedia, fashion and textiles, food science, or being a teaching assistant for a teacher, the office, or the library.

Layout
The school is laid out in a fairly simple manner. There are bike racks for the students to put their bikes: one in the front of the school and one near the gym. There are six basketball courts to the west of the gym. The classrooms fit in around the basketball courts, the gym, the lunch eating areas and the quad. On most of the walls, there are banks of lockers. At the back of the school there is an amphitheater, and near the basketball courts there is an outlying group of six or seven classrooms known as "Area 51".

Athletics
HJHS offers many sports programs such as cross country, volleyball, soccer, track and field, and basketball.  Freshman students may take part in the same sports on the DHS teams, which also include field hockey, water polo, football, baseball, softball, cross country and ski and snowboard teams.

Clubs
Like many other schools, Holmes has different clubs around campus.  As students leave the school and new ones join, the clubs change, as the majority of them are created by students, and advertised to the school during Club Rush, an annual school event. Some of these include the Associated Student Body (ASB), the Homework Club, Math Club, Art Club, GSA, Honor Society, Latino Club, Science Club, Chess Club, Sign Club, and the International Language Club.

References

External links
 Oliver Wendell Holmes Junior High School

Public middle schools in California
Buildings and structures in Davis, California
Schools in Yolo County, California